Harold William Hounsfield Riley Sr. (December 15, 1877 – January 1, 1946) was a member of the Legislative Assembly of Alberta.

He was born in St. Lambert, Quebec and his family moved to Calgary in 1888.

On October 31, 1911 after the death of Archibald McArthur, Mr. Riley ran for the Conservative Party, in what would be known as the brothers by-election. His brother Ezra Riley represented the same district from 1906 to 1910. In the election he faced John Peter McArthur, brother to the late Archibald McArthur. He served Gleichen until the 1913 Election. During the 1913 he ran in Bow Valley, he was defeated by George Lane from the Liberal party.

He was married to Maude Riley (née Keen) in 1907, who is best known for convincing the Calgary Police Force to hire women in 1913. They had three children; Harriet Maude (1909), Harold William Jr. and George Albert.

During World War I, he enlisted with the 137th Battalion in the First World War. After the war he helped found the Southern Alberta Pioneers' and Old Timers' Association, and he served as secretary from 1921 to 1943.

From 1926 to 1932 he was secretary-treasurer of the Calgary Stock Exchange.

References

External links

Glenbow Museum Archives for Maude and Harold Riley
Harold Riley Pioneer Profiles

1877 births
1946 deaths
Progressive Conservative Association of Alberta MLAs
Calgary city councillors
People from Saint-Lambert, Quebec